is a Japanese basketball coach and former player. Suzuki is the current head coach of SeaHorses Mikawa. He served as head coach of the Japan national basketball team two times. Suzuki's first term was from 2006 to 2007 while his second one was from May 2012 until 2014.

Head coaching record

|- 
| style="text-align:left;"|Aisin
| style="text-align:left;"|1994
| 15||11||4|||| style="text-align:center;"|2nd|||-||-||-||
| style="text-align:center;"|Runners-up
|-
| style="text-align:left;"|Aisin
| style="text-align:left;"|1995
| 16||4||12|||| style="text-align:center;"|10th|||-||-||-||
| style="text-align:center;"|-
|- 
| style="text-align:left;"|Aisin
| style="text-align:left;"|1996
| 16||5||11|||| style="text-align:center;"|11th|||-||-||-||
| style="text-align:center;"|-
|- 
| style="text-align:left;"|Aisin
| style="text-align:left;"|1997
| 16||5||11|||| style="text-align:center;"|10th|||-||-||-||
| style="text-align:center;"|-
|- 
| style="text-align:left;"|Aisin
| style="text-align:left;"|1998
| 16||9||7|||| style="text-align:center;"|7th|||-||-||-||
| style="text-align:center;"|-
|- 
| style="text-align:left;"|Aisin
| style="text-align:left;"|1999
| 16||7||9|||| style="text-align:center;"|3rd|||-||-||-||
| style="text-align:center;"|4th
|- 
| style="text-align:left;"|Aisin
| style="text-align:left;"|2000
| 21||13||8|||| style="text-align:center;"|3rd|||2||0||2||
| style="text-align:center;"|3rd
|- 
| style="text-align:left;"|Aisin
| style="text-align:left;"|2001
| 21||17||4|||| style="text-align:center;"|1st|||2||0||2||
| style="text-align:center;"|3rd
|- 
|- style="background:#FDE910;"
| style="text-align:left;"|Aisin
| style="text-align:left;"|2002
| 21||18||3|||| style="text-align:center;"|1st|||4||4||0||
| style="text-align:center;"|JBL Champions
|- 
|- style="background:#FDE910;"
| style="text-align:left;"|Aisin
| style="text-align:left;"|2003
| 28||20||8|||| style="text-align:center;"|1st|||5||5||1||
| style="text-align:center;"|JBL Champions
|- 
| style="text-align:left;"|Aisin
| style="text-align:left;"|2004
| 28||22||6|||| style="text-align:center;"|1st|||6||2||4||
| style="text-align:center;"|Runners-up
|- 
| style="text-align:left;"|Aisin
| style="text-align:left;"|2005
| 26||11||15|||| style="text-align:center;"|5th|||-||-||-||
| style="text-align:center;"|5th
|- 
| style="text-align:left;"|Aisin
| style="text-align:left;"|2006
| 24||14||10|||| style="text-align:center;"|3rd|||2||0||2||
| style="text-align:center;"|3rd
|- 
|- style="background:#FDE910;"
| style="text-align:left;"|Aisin
| style="text-align:left;"|2007-08
| 35||26||9|||| style="text-align:center;"|1st|||7||5||2||
| style="text-align:center;"|JBL Champions
|- 
|- style="background:#FDE910;"
| style="text-align:left;"|Aisin
| style="text-align:left;"|2008-09
| 35||24||11|||| style="text-align:center;"|1st|||6||5||1||
| style="text-align:center;"|JBL Champions
|- 
| style="text-align:left;"|Aisin
| style="text-align:left;"|2009-10
| 42||31||11|||| style="text-align:center;"|1st|||5||2||3||
| style="text-align:center;"|Runners-up
|- 
| style="text-align:left;"|Aisin
| style="text-align:left;"|2010-11
| 36||26||10|||| style="text-align:center;"|1st|||-||-||-||
| style="text-align:center;"|-
|- 
| style="text-align:left;"|Aisin
| style="text-align:left;"|2011-12
| 42||31||11|||| style="text-align:center;"|1st|||7||3||4||
| style="text-align:center;"|Runners-up
|- 
|- style="background:#FDE910;"
| style="text-align:left;"|Aisin
| style="text-align:left;"|2012-13
| 42||34||8|||| style="text-align:center;"|1st|||7||5||2||
| style="text-align:center;"|JBL Champions
|- 
| style="text-align:left;"|Aisin
| style="text-align:left;"|2013-14
| 54||40||14|||| style="text-align:center;"|2nd in Western|||5||3||2||
| style="text-align:center;"|4th
|- 
|- style="background:#FDE910;"
| style="text-align:left;"|Aisin
| style="text-align:left;"|2014-15
| 54||43||11|||| style="text-align:center;"|1st in Western|||8||7||1||
| style="text-align:center;"|NBL Champions
|- 
| style="text-align:left;"|Aisin
| style="text-align:left;"|2015-16
| 53||35||18|||| style="text-align:center;"|4th|||9||6||3||
| style="text-align:center;"|Runners-up
|- 
| style="text-align:left;"|Mikawa
| style="text-align:left;"|2016-17
| 60||46||14|||| style="text-align:center;"|1st in Western|||5||3||2||
| style="text-align:center;"|Lost in 2nd round
|- 
| style="text-align:left;"|Mikawa
| style="text-align:left;"|2017-18
| 60||48||12|||| style="text-align:center;"|1st in Central|||4||2||2||
| style="text-align:center;"|Lost in 2nd round
|- 
| style="text-align:left;"|Mikawa
| style="text-align:left;"|2018-19
| 60||31||29|||| style="text-align:center;"|4th in Central|||-||-||-||
| style="text-align:center;"|-
|- 
| style="text-align:left;"|Mikawa
| style="text-align:left;"|2019-20
| 41||18||23|||| style="text-align:center;"|2nd in Central|||-||-||-||
| style="text-align:center;"|-
|-

References

1959 births
Living people
Japanese basketball coaches
Japan national basketball team coaches
SeaHorses Mikawa coaches